The International Geodetic Student Organisation (also known as IGSO) is an international, independent, non-political, non-profit organisation run by and for geodesy students and young geodesists.

Aim 
The aims of the IGSO are:
 to bring organisations of geodesy students of all countries together
 to represent geodetic students in public
 to organise connections between the member associations 
 to establish and to strengthen the co-operation with the authorities

These aims are organised and realised by the International Geodetic Students Meeting (IGSM) and the General Assembly.

Structure 
The members of the IGSO are associations of universities representing geodetic students.

The IGSO consists of these institutions:
The General Assembly.
The International Geodetic Students Agency (the General Secretary, the Treasurer, and the Actuary)
The auditors of account.

The structure of the IGSO and the realisation of the IGSM 2004 was presented at the ISPRS meeting 2006.

Meetings and Activities 
Every year the IGSO organises an International Geodetic Students Meeting (IGSM) in a different country. These meetings allow students to exchange experiences from geodesy and to get to know other countries' customs and culture.

History 
The first IGSM was organised in the Netherlands by geodesy students from the TU Delft. The IGSO was founded later during the fourth IGSM in Graz, Austria.

Past and future meetings:

Partners 
The IGSO is a partner organisation of the International Federation of Surveyors (FIG)

See also 
International Association of Geodesy

References

External links 

International student organizations
Geodesy organizations
Organisations based in Zürich
Student organizations established in 1991
1991 establishments in the Netherlands
International geographic data and information organizations